Jack Gray (5 May 1916 – 15 September 2008) was  a former Australian rules footballer who played with Footscray in the Victorian Football League (VFL).

Notes

External links 
		

1916 births
2008 deaths
Australian rules footballers from Victoria (Australia)
Western Bulldogs players
Yarraville Football Club players